Pieve Emanuele is a comune (municipality) in the Italian region of Lombardy, located about  south of Milan, and about  north of Pavia.

Pieve Emanuele borders the following municipalities: Rozzano, Opera, Locate di Triulzi, Basiglio, Lacchiarella, Siziano.

It is served by Pieve Emanuele railway station.

International relations

 
Pieve Emanuele is twinned with:
 Zimnicea, Romania
 Attard, Malta

See also 

 Castello di Tosinasco, Pieve Emanuele

References

External links
 Official website
 Pieve Emanuele Urban blog 

Cities and towns in Lombardy